Olof Hvidén-Watson (born 10 August 1982) is a Swedish football midfielder. He became slightly famous in Norway in 2007 when he played for the Norwegian Premiership club Odd Grenland, most of the season. Towards the end of the 2007 season he was loaned out to first division side Bodø/Glimt. Hvidén-Watson ended up playing for Bodø/Glimt against Odd Grenland in the final play off match for The Premier Division. Bodø/Glimt won, and he helped relegate the club that owned him.

External links

1982 births
Living people
Swedish footballers
Fredrikstad FK players
Pors Grenland players
Olof Hviden-Watson
Odds BK players
FK Bodø/Glimt players
Veikkausliiga players
Eliteserien players
Norwegian First Division players
Expatriate footballers in Norway
Swedish expatriate sportspeople in Norway
Expatriate footballers in Finland
Expatriate footballers in Thailand
Swedish expatriate sportspeople in Finland
Swedish expatriate footballers
FC Trollhättan players
Swedish expatriate sportspeople in Thailand
Association football midfielders
Footballers from Gothenburg